RK Eurofarm Pelister II (HC Eurofarm Pelister II) is a team handball club from Bitola, North Macedonia. It serves as the second team for RK Eurofarm Pelister.

History
The original team was the first handball club in Macedonia, formed in 1946 under the name Pelagonija. It later changed its name to Pelister in 1955. The 60s were very successful, winning 4 championships starting in 1960 until the last one in 1969. The club ended up winning three more titles in the 70s. In the 80s, the 1981 season was the last winning season, capturing their 8th Macedonian league title. From the 1983–84 season, Pelister began to participate regularly in the Yugoslav Handball Championship. They finished in third place in 1985 and were runners-up in back-to-back seasons (1986–87 and 1987–88) behind the dominant club Metaloplastika Šabac. Around that time the slogan "He who hasn't played in Bitola doesn't know what real support looks like" gained popularity, being uttered by the likes of Vlado Šola, Lino Červar and Zlatan Saračević. Pelister became the first Macedonian club to play in Europe. In 1986 they defeated AS Filippos Veriasand in the 1st round, but they ended up losing in 1/8 finals from Atlético Madrid BM winning 24:19 at home and 10:19 away (34:38) aggregate. In the 1988/1989 season they reached the EHF Cup quarterfinal, eliminating SPE Strovolos Nicosia, HC Banik and finally losing out to German club ASK Vorwärts. The first leg in Bitola was won by six goals, but the second leg in Berlin resulted in a loss by seven points 22:16 and 13:22 (35:38). When the Macedonian Handball Super League was formed in 1992, Pelister became the most successful club in the country, winning five league titles and five Cups that decade. In 1996, they made it to the semi-finals of the EHF Cup Winners' Cup where they lost on aggregate by one goal to the eventual champion TBV Lemgo. A record, 7,000 fans were in attendance for the rematch in Bitola. Another proof of Pelisters' dominance at the time, seven players on Macedonia's squad at the 1999 World Men's Handball Championship in Egypt played for the club.

The club's most successful European run was made during the 2001/02 season when they played in the EHF Challenge Cup. First, they started by beating Zilant Kazan in the 3rd round and advanced to round 4, where they went on to defeat Paris St. Germain on away goals. In the quarterfinal they got past Kilkis GAC 52–51, setting up a semifinal match-up with Frederiksberg IF. Pelister would go on to win that tie in dramatic fashion in Bitola, when Naumče Mojsovski scored a goal in the final seconds of the game to even the score on aggregate, going through on a penalty shootout by the final score of 61–60. In the final, Pelister lost to Skjern Håndbold, but even in that match-up they still ended up winning the home game by 7 goals. Proving yet again that it was no easy task for any road team to win in Bitola.

In 2005, Trifun Kostovski's Kometal became sponsor of the club bringing back the glory days, winning another double crown and capturing its sixth domestic league title, which was a record at the time. However, the success was short lived as Kometal left the following season. Since then, Pelister had been marred by financial problems and struggled to achieve the same level of success.

On 29 November 2019, a joint ownership was signed by the owners of RK Eurofarm Rabotnik (owned by Eurofarm) and RK Pelister (owned by Bitola Municipality). According to the platform, RK Eurofarm Rabotnik would change the name to RK Eurofarm Pelister, and the original RK Pelister would change its name to RK Eurofarm Pelister 2. Eurofarm Pelister will be the leading club with high European ambitions, while Eurofarm Pelister 2 will be a developmental club filled with young handball players from Bitola and all of Macedonia. The combination of a strong sponsor and a sports brand known throughout the former Yugoslavia took final shape through an agreement with the city administration in 2020. Eurofarm Pelister has already surpassed the domestic framework, played in the EHF Champions League and set the contours of a team that could return trophies back to "Boro Čurlevski" arena.

Accomplishments

Domestic 
Macedonian Handball Super League 
 Winner (14): 1961, 1966, 1968, 1969, 1970, 1971, 1979, 1981, 1993, 1994, 1996, 1998, 2000, 2005

Macedonian Handball Cup
 Winner (6): 1990, 1994, 1996, 1998, 1999, 2005

 Macedonian Handball Super Cup
 Winner (1): 2021, 2022

International 
Doboj International Handball Tournament (2)
 1st: 1996 and 1997

European 
EHF Cup
Quarter-finalist (1): 1988-89

EHF Cup Winners' Cup
 3rd: 1995-96

EHF Challenge Cup
 2nd:: 2001–02

Arena 

Sports hall "Mladost" (Macedonian: Спортска сала „Младост“) is a multi-purpose sports arena located in Bitola, North Macedonia. It was built in 1975 by the citizens of Bitola and is mainly used for handball by RK Pelister and RK Bitola, and for basketball by KK Pelister. There is also room for bowling and table tennis plus it has been used for concerts. The Arena hosted the 2007 Macedonian Basketball Cup. This sports hall was the largest on the territory of North Macedonia before the construction of the Boris Trajkovski Sports Center in Skopje.

On 21 July 2009, the arena is undergoing renovation. A new parquet floor will be installed along with new seats. The locker rooms will also be updated to meet EHF standards. Total cost of the project is about €30,000.

In January 2017, renovation of interior of the hall started. The renovation covered the floor, the stands, a new score board and a new heating system. The first match in the renovated arena was played on April 6, 2017, with the match between RK Pelister and RK Metalurg in the second round of the handball Super League play-off.

At the end of July 2018, the name of the hall was changed to "Boro Churlevski", in honor of the late Boro Churlevski, a former handball player from Bitola.Churlevski Arena has a capacity of 4000 seats.

Supporters
Abdomens are an Ultras group, established in 1985, who support the Macedonian sports clubs from Bitola that compete under the Pelister banner, mainly FK Pelister in football and RK Pelister in handball. The group was founded in 1985 when a caravan of 15 buses traveled to support RK Pelister who was playing against Partizan Bjelovar in a handball relegation play-off match. At that time they used the name BMČM - Bitolčani, Motorcyclists, Čkembari, Macedonians (македонски: БМЧМ - Битолчани, Мотокари, Чкембари, Македонци) later shortened to just Čkembari. Soon after, the first green and white banners were created that read: "Hell Boys" (македонски: Пеколни момци) and "Green Conquerors" (македонски: Зелени освојувачи) which started organized support for Pelister at every match. Since Eurofarm Rabotnik and Pelister got mutual ownership, Čkembari became supporters of Eurofarm Rabotnik (renamed after the mutual ownership as Eurofarm Pelister).

Current squad
Squad for the 2022–23 season

Goalkeepers
 12  Martin Jovanovski
 16  Vasilije Pečurica
Right Wingers
9  Nikola Stoilevski
 44  Nenad Belistojanoski
 88  Dimitrij Blaževski
Left Wingers
2  Andrej Markovski
 22  Ivan Dimitrovski
 66  Bojan Madzovski
Line players
6  Samoil Ristevski

Left Backs
 10  Hristijan Mitrevski
 67  Bogdan Mijušković
Central Backs
 23  Stefan Talevski (c)
 35  Martin Ivanovski
 84  Martin Tabakoski 
Right Backs
4  Meris Bošnjak
 11  Simon Mirčeski 
 27  Andre Butorac
 31  Pavle Petrović

Technical staff
  Head Coach: 
  Assistant coach: Aleksandar Zarkov
  Goalkeeping coach: Zoran Atanasovski
  Conditioning coach: Vasko Dimitrovski
  Physiotherapist: Petar Micevski

Notable former players as Pelister

  Vasko Dimitrovski
  Pepi Manaskov
  Kiril Lazarov
  Filip Lazarov
  Vlatko Mitkov
  Stevče Aluševski
  Zlatko Mojsovski
  Petar Angelov
  Naumče Mojsovski
  Vančo Dimovski
  Aco Jonovski
  Vladimir Temelkov
  Rade Stojanović
  Branislav Angelovski
  Zvonko Šundovski
  Stefan Drogrishki
  Filip Kuzmanovski
  Zoran Petkovski
  Ivan Markovski
  Nikola Mitrevski
  Vasil Mitevski
  Boris Churlevski
  Igor Nikolovski
  Kire Popovski
  Kire Mitrevski
  Igor Trajkovski
  Goce Makalovski
  Tome Petrevski
  Aleksandar Zarkov
  Lazar Spirovski
  Zlatko Dimitrovski
  Igor Toskovski
  Stevce Stefanovski
  Abdula Jusifovski 
  Dušan Novokmet
 Šandor Hodik
  Dejan Peric
  Aleksandar Stanojević
  Bilal Šuman

Notable former players as Eurofarm Pelister 2
  Stefan Drogrishki
  Jovan Talevski
  Blagojče Trajkovski
  Dimitar Dimitrioski
  Vasko Dimitrovski
  Dejan Kukulovski
  Filip Arsenovski
  Milan Đukić

Notable former coaches as Pelister
 Ante Kostelić
 Kasim Kamenica
 Nikola "Gužva" Jevremović
 Zoran Zečević
 Joško Petkovič
 Ratko Đurković  
 Bogdan Macovei
 Stevče Stefanovski
 Zvonko Šundovski
 Cane Krstevski
 Borče Markovski
 Tome Petreski
 Aleksandar Zarkov

References

External links
Official Website 
Facebook fan page 
RFM Profile 
EHF Profile 

Eurofarm Pelister
Handball clubs established in 1955
Sport in Bitola
1955 establishments in the Socialist Republic of Macedonia